Harry Root "Doc" Shanley (January 30, 1889 – December 13, 1934) was a major league baseball short-stop. In 5 career games, he had no hits in 8 at-bats. He batted and threw right-handed.

Shanley was born in Granbury, Texas and died in St. Petersburg, Florida.

External links
Baseball Reference.com page

1889 births
1934 deaths
St. Louis Browns players
Major League Baseball shortstops
Baseball players from Texas
People from Granbury, Texas
Clear Lake Rabbits players